Robin Wettlaufer is the Canadian representative to the Palestinian Authority between 2020 and 2022.

Wettlaufer earned a BA in International Relations from the University of British Columbia in 1998 and an MA in Political Science from York University in 2000.

References

External links
How Canada approved an Assad loyalist to serve the country’s terrorized Syrian refugees

Year of birth missing (living people)
Living people
Canadian women diplomats
University of British Columbia alumni
York University alumni
Ambassadors of Canada to the State of Palestine